John Anthony Hardinge Giffard, 3rd Earl of Halsbury FRS (4 June 1908 – 14 January 2000), was a British crossbencher peer and scientist. Halsbury succeeded to the title in 1943.

Early life
Giffard was educated at Ludgrove School (where a schoolmaster inspired an interest in astronomy) and Eton. His years at Eton were highly successful, as he was a house captain, rowed in the school eight, and was elected to the small band of school prefects known as Pop.

Career
Giffard was Managing Director of the National Research Development Corporation 1949–1959, after having been Director of Research of Decca Record Company 1947–1949, and previously worked for Lever Brothers, and Brown-Firth Research Laboratories. Subsequently he served on many public bodies, including chairing the Committee on Decimal Currency (1961–1963). Between 1966 and 1997 he was Chancellor of Brunel University.

He was President of the British Computer Society during 1969–70. In 1970 he was awarded an Honorary Fellowship of the British Psychological Society.

In addition, he was also a friend of J. R. R. Tolkien and was one of the few people to read The Silmarillion in Tolkien's lifetime, in 1957.

His grandmother was the Edwardian couturiere Lady Duff-Gordon, otherwise known by her professional name Lucile, who was a survivor of the  disaster.

References

External links

 Obituary from The Guardian

1908 births
2000 deaths
British chief executives
Earls in the Peerage of the United Kingdom
Fellows of the Royal Society
People associated with Brunel University London
Presidents of the British Computer Society
People educated at Ludgrove School
People educated at Eton College

Halsbury